Farhang Sharif (– 7 September 2016) was an Iranian musician and renowned tar player.

Biography 
Farhang Sharif learned music under the mentorship of his father starting at a young age. He learned to play tar with maestros Abdolhossein Shahnazi and Morteza Neidavoud, two masters of tar who lived during the Qajar and Pahlavi periods. As a result, he performed his first radio solo at the age of 12. Sharif has collaborated with notable musicians such as Mohammad-Reza Shajarian, Akbar Golpayegani, Gholam Hossein Banan, Iraj and Mahmoud Khansari. He also performed at Berlin's music festival. He made his first solo performance in a live radio program at the age of 12. Sharif is considered one of the greatest tar players and traditional composers of modern Iranian history. He is often referred to as "ostad" which means "master" in Persian. He died of respiratory problem at his home in Tehran at 85 years old.

Achievements 
 Sharif was awarded the first rank badge of art equal to doctorate degree, by President Mohammad Khatami.

See also
 Music of Iran
 List of Iranian musicians

References

1931 births
2016 deaths
Iranian tar players
Persian classical musicians
People from Amol
Iranian composers